Impaction is bowel obstruction that can occur in various kinds of animals when they consume something that they cannot digest. Once the substance is ingested it will block the digestive tract and, if untreated, cause death.

Symptoms
Some symptoms include a lack of appetite or lethargy. On many reptiles a large blue seemingly bruised spot will be visible in the abdomen; however, this only shows through if the skin on the species is clear enough to see the lower internal organs.

Treatment
Common treatments involve placing the reptile in a lukewarm bath and gently rubbing the area under the impaction to help the passing of the consumed substance. Place both thumbs on the back at the middle, put the first two fingers of the hand under the belly and rub gently in a circular way until the reptile defecates. If this fails, the animal must have an enema.

See also
 Aerosol impaction
 Fecal impaction
 Horse impaction

References

Animal diseases
Gastrointestinal tract disorders